Christopher Andrew White (born January 15, 1989) is a former American football linebacker. He was drafted by the Buffalo Bills in the sixth round of the 2011 NFL Draft. White attended Vancleave (Miss.) High School. He played college football at Mississippi Gulf Coast Community College and Mississippi State.

On August 25, 2013, White was traded to the Lions in exchange for Thaddeus Lewis.  On September 1, 2013, he was claimed off waivers by the New England Patriots.

White was a member of the Patriots when they won Super Bowl XLIX over the Seattle Seahawks, 28–24. On August 10, 2015, the Patriots released White.

References

External links 
 
 Mississippi State Bulldogs football bio

1989 births
Living people
Players of American football from Mississippi
American football linebackers
Mississippi State Bulldogs football players
People from Jackson County, Mississippi
Buffalo Bills players
Detroit Lions players
New England Patriots players
Mississippi Gulf Coast Bulldogs football players